Señor Río is an ultra-premium brand of tequila produced in Tequila, Jalisco, Mexico and imported by Jalisco International Imports.

Made from 100% Blue Weber Agaves, harvested in the Jalisco lowlands, Señor Río comes in three varieties: Blanco, "Reposado", and Añejo.

History
Jalisco International Imports, based in Queen Creek, Arizona, was formed in 2009 by Jonathan Gach and Debbie Medina.

Awards
Senor Rio's Blanco - Bronze Medal, 2009 Spirits of Mexico Competition.
Senor Rio's Anejo - Bronze Medal, 2010 The San Francisco World Spirits Competition.

References

External links
Señor Río Tequila

Tequila
Alcoholic drink brands